Silence Magnifies Sound is a studio album by the Ohio post-rock band the Six Parts Seven. It was released in 2000 on Troubleman Unlimited. It includes the songs "Spaces Between Days (Parts 1 & 2)", with parts 3 and 4 on the following album, Things Shaped in Passing.

Critical reception
Exclaim! wrote that "the playing is solid; guitar work is gorgeous, the drumming is understated and just listening to the viola effortlessly float in induces a complete rush." The Cleveland Scene wrote that "while there is an off-putting pretentiousness about the band, it compares favorably to post-rock such as Mogwai, Tortoise, and Trans Am."

Track listing
 "In a Late Style of Fire" – 6:18
 "The Slowest Way of Saying So Little" – 6:01
 "Spaces Between Days (Part 1)" – 1:23
 "The Constant Variables" – 4:29
 "Spaces Between Days (Part 2)" – 1:47
 "The Day After the Day After Here" – 4:24
 "One Thing That Won't Matter." - 2:47
 "Silence Magnifies Sound" - 4:22
 "Changing the Name of October" - 9:39

References

Silence Magnifies Sound
Silence Magnifies Sound